Sors is an ancient Roman god of luck.  

Sors may also refer to:
 The singular form of sortes
 Sors, Azerbaijan
 Statistical Office of the Republic of Slovenia
 Spatially Offset Raman Spectroscopy